BabelNet is a multilingual lexicalized semantic network and ontology developed at the NLP group of the Sapienza University of Rome. BabelNet was automatically created by linking Wikipedia to the most popular computational lexicon of the English language, WordNet. The integration is done using an automatic mapping and by filling in lexical gaps in resource-poor languages by using statistical machine translation. The result is an encyclopedic dictionary that provides concepts and named entities lexicalized in many languages and connected with large amounts of semantic relations. Additional lexicalizations and definitions are added by linking to free-license wordnets, OmegaWiki, the English Wiktionary, Wikidata, FrameNet, VerbNet and others. Similarly to WordNet, BabelNet groups words in different languages into sets of synonyms, called Babel synsets. For each Babel synset, BabelNet provides short definitions (called glosses) in many languages harvested from both WordNet and Wikipedia.

Statistics of BabelNet

, BabelNet (version 5.0) covers 500 languages. It contains almost 20 million synsets and around 1.4 billion word senses (regardless of their language). Each Babel synset contains 2 synonyms per language, i.e., word senses, on average. The semantic network includes all the lexico-semantic relations from WordNet (hypernymy and hyponymy, meronymy and holonymy, antonymy and synonymy, etc., totaling around 364,000 relation edges) as well as an underspecified relatedness relation from Wikipedia (totaling around 1.3 billion edges). Version 5.0 also associates around 51 million images with Babel synsets and provides a Lemon RDF encoding of the resource, available via a SPARQL endpoint. 2.67 million synsets are assigned domain labels.

Applications

BabelNet has been shown to enable multilingual Natural Language Processing applications. The lexicalized knowledge available in BabelNet has been shown to obtain state-of-the-art results in:

 semantic relatedness
 multilingual Word Sense Disambiguation
 multilingual Word Sense Disambiguation and Entity Linking with the Babelfy system
 video games with a purpose

Prizes and acknowledgments
BabelNet received the META prize 2015 for "groundbreaking work in overcoming language barriers through a multilingual lexicalised semantic network and ontology making use of heterogeneous data sources". 

BabelNet featured prominently in a Time magazine article about the new age of innovative and up-to-date lexical knowledge resources available on the Web.

See also

 Babelfy
 EuroWordNet
 vidby
 Knowledge acquisition
 Linguistic Linked Open Data
 Semantic network
 Semantic relatedness
 Wikidata
 Wiktionary
 Word sense disambiguation
 Word sense induction
 UBY

References

External links 
 

Lexical databases
Knowledge bases
Ontology (information science)
Knowledge representation
Computational linguistics
Online dictionaries
Multilingualism